Manasu Mallige is an Indian Kannada-language romantic drama film directed by S. Narayan and produced by Rockline Venkatesh and Akash Chawla. The film, a remake of Nagraj Manjule's Marathi film Sairat (2016), features Rinku Rajguru, reprising her role from the original, and Nishanth (Nataraj). The original  soundtrack by Ajay–Atul has been re-used with Kannada lyrics, the cinematography is by Manohar Joshi.

Overview 
The film depicts love-story between a girl of an upper caste and a boy from a lower caste; thus it comments on the caste system in India. This commentary culminates into honour killing; honour killing prevalent in few parts of rural India as well as urban India. The music of Manasu Mallige was released on 14 February 2017. It was written by Ajay–Atul, who kept the original score and just added Kannada lyrics in place of the original Marathi ones. All songs have been sung by the same singers who rendered the original songs, except an additional song which has been rendered by Sonu Nigam.

Cast 
 Rinku Rajguru
 Nishanth
 Tanaji Galgunde
 Sourabh Kulakarni

Soundtrack 

The songs and background score for the film are composed by composer duo Ajay–Atul, who had scored for the original Marathi film. This marks their debut in the Kannada cinema. One additional song was composed by S. Narayan. The music was officially released on the Valentine's Day on 14 February 2017. Minister of Water Resources, M. B. Patil officially released the audio at Chamundeshwari Studios in Bengaluru.

References 

2017 films
2010s Kannada-language films
Kannada remakes of Marathi films
2017 romantic drama films
Films about the caste system in India
Indian romantic drama films
Films directed by S. Narayan
Films scored by Ajay–Atul
Rockline Entertainments films